Astolfo's rail (Gallirallus astolfoi) is an extinct species of flightless bird in the Rallidae, or rail family. It lived in Rapa Iti, one of the Bass Islands in French Polynesia.

History
This rail species was described in 2021 from a subfossil bone collected in 2002 by Atholl Anderson at the Tangarutu Cave site on the island of Rapa Iti in French Polynesia. Occupation of the cave likely dates back to between 1400 and 1600 CE. The species likely became extinct after human settlement on Rapa Iti.

Etymology
The specific epithet honors the fictional character Astolfo, who is one of Charlemagne's paladins in the Matter of France. In the epic Orlando Furioso, by Ludovico Ariosto, Astolfo becomes trapped on a remote island because of the sorceress Alcina.

See also
 List of birds of French Polynesia

References

Gallirallus
Extinct flightless birds
†
Late Quaternary prehistoric birds
Holocene extinctions
Extinct birds of Oceania
Fossil taxa described in 2021
Birds described in 2021